Melissa Kelly is an American chef in Rockland, Maine in the United States.  She received the 1999 and 2013 Best Chef in the Northeast honors in a James Beard Award.  She co-founded Primo restaurant and is its executive chef preparing Italian cuisine and Mediterranean cuisine with a focus on local ingredients. She graduated first in class from the Culinary Institute of America and worked with Larry Forgione at An American Place and Alice Waters at Chez Panisse. Chef Kelly currently owns/operates PRIMO Restaurants in Rockland, ME and the Ritz Carlton Marriott Resort Grand Lakes in Orlando, FL. She re-opened her Orlando location in the fall of 2021 after an extensive renovation completely reimagining the property and tracing Chef Kelly’s family roots back to Puglia, Italy. PRIMO at the Ritz Carlton Resort Grande Lakes in Orlando, FL in the Fall of 2021.

References

American chefs
American women chefs
Culinary Institute of America alumni
Year of birth missing
James Beard Foundation Award winners